Thyellisca is a genus of marine clams in the family Semelidae.

References

External links 
 Thyellisca at the Catalogue of Life
 Thyellisca at the World Register of Marine Species (WoRMS)

Semelidae
Bivalve genera